Hydrogenophaga crassostreae is a Gram-negative, rod-shaped, aerobic and motile bacterium from the genus of Hydrogenophaga which has been isolated from the oyster Crassostrea gigas.

References

External links
Type strain of Hydrogenophaga crassostreae at BacDive -  the Bacterial Diversity Metadatabase

Comamonadaceae
Bacteria described in 2017